Japanese Village was the nickname for a range of houses constructed in 1943 by the U.S. Army in the Dugway Proving Ground in Utah, roughly  southwest of Salt Lake City.

History
Dugway was a high-security testing facility for chemical and biological weapons. The purpose of the replicas of Japanese homes, which were repeatedly rebuilt after being intentionally burned down, was to perfect the use of incendiary bombing tactics, the fire bombing of Japanese cities during World War II.

Testing on the Japanese Village at Dugway Proving Ground coincided with the erosion of precision bombing practice in the U.S. Army Air Force and validated civilians as targets of air warfare during World War II. As such, the interiors of Japanese Village contained furnishing (including tables, futon, radios, chests, hibachi stoves, etc.) as found in contemporaneous Japanese housing.

The principal architect for Japanese village was Antonin Raymond who had spent many years building in Japan. Boris Laiming, who had studied fires in Japan, writing a report on the 1923 Tokyo fire, also contributed.

The most successful bomb to come out of the May–September 1943 tests against the mock-up Japanese homes was the napalm-filled M-69 Incendiary cluster bomb. Contenders had been the M-47 (containing coconut oil, rubber, and gasoline) and the M-50 (a blend of magnesium and powdered aluminum and iron oxide). Also tested was the "Bat bomb" a lightweight "bat incendiary" that was attached to live bats.

For the tests B-17 and B-24 bombers were used operating at normal bombing altitude, and the effects on the villages were meticulously recorded.

Popular culture
The novel The Gods of Heavenly Punishment by Jennifer Cody Epstein contains a fictionalized account of the building and destruction of the Japanese Village.

See also
German Village
Strategic bombing during World War II

Further reading
Dylan J. Plung, "The Japanese Village at Dugway Proving Ground: An Unexamined Context to the Firebombing of Japan," Asia-Pacific Journal: Japan Focus, Volume 16, Issue 8, No. 3, April 15, 2018. 
Stewart Halsey Ross, "Strategic bombing by the United States in World War II"

References

External links

 German-Japanese-Village
 Aerial view of German and Japanese villages, May 27 1943
 Assault on German village
 US Army Bases
 Dugway MIL site on the village (With images of the village)
 Incendiary jelly Time Magazine on M-69

Aerial bombing
Aerial warfare strategy
Incendiary weapons
Firebombings
Chemical warfare facilities
Japan in World War II
World War II strategic bombing of Japan
1940s in Japan
1940s conflicts
Firebombings in Japan
1943 establishments in Utah
Buildings and structures completed in 1943
Buildings and structures in Tooele County, Utah